is a former Japanese professional football player who played as a goalkeeper, most notably with Yokohama Flügels from 1991–1997.

Playing career

Yokohama Flugels (1991–1997) 
Mori was born in Hyogo Prefecture on May 31, 1972. After graduating from high school, he joined All Nippon Airways (later renamed to Yokohama Flügels) in 1991. Upon the clubs election to the J League as founding members in 1993, Mori was the club's regular goalkeeper and became recognisable and popular for his dreadlocked hair among the club's supporters, who nicknamed him "Reggae-kun". He kept 5 clean sheets in the inaugural J League season as the Flügels finished 6th, reached the semi-finals of the J League Cup, and won the 1993 Emperor's Cup, as well as the 1994–95 Asian Cup Winners' Cup, with his performances eventually leading to talks of a national team call-up, however, Mori's career ground to a halt on August 12, 1995 after an incident during a 6-0 loss to Urawa Red Diamonds. Dissatisfied with the referee, Mori intentionally barged his shoulder against the official and was subsequently sent off and handed a three month suspension, during which rookie goalkeeper Seigo Narazaki took his place in goal and eventually became the favoured #1 for the Flügels.

Consadole Sapporo (1997) 
Mori briefly returned to the side during the 1996-97 season, but never regained his regular starting position and was transferred to Japan Football League club Consadole Sapporo in April 1997. Mori was unable to overtake Dido Havenaar as the club's first choice and played just 5 times, before retiring upon the end of the season at the age of 25.

Personal life 

Mori married model and fashion designer Misaki in 1995. The two have a daughter, born in 1996.

Mori became a fan of reggae music and Jamaican culture in the early 1990s, particularly Bob Marley and The Wailers; he reflected this on the field with dreadlocked hair during his early career.

After his retirement from football, Mori opened a bar called "Rock Steady" in Tokyo. Mori often works in the bar as a DJ, mainly playing reggae, ska, funk, rock-a-billy, and blues.

In 2005, Mori founded the fashion brand "Wacko Maria" with fellow former professional footballer Keiji Ishizuka.

Club statistics

References

External links

1972 births
Living people
Association football people from Hyōgo Prefecture
Japanese footballers
Japan Soccer League players
J1 League players
Japan Football League (1992–1998) players
Yokohama Flügels players
Hokkaido Consadole Sapporo players
Association football goalkeepers